The Rhine delta of Lake Constance is the river delta on the southeastern shore of Lake Constance, which the Rhine (also called Alpine Rhine (Alpenrhein)) has formed in a former sea area. It lies mostly in the Austrian province of Vorarlberg, smaller areas are in the Swiss canton of St. Gallen. The two peninsulas in the lake are called Rheinspitz (west) and Rohrspitz (east).

Geography 
The delta of the Alpine Rhine forms a common delta area with the eastern deltas of the rivers Dornbirner Ach and Bregenzer Ach. In the north, the border of the Rhine delta runs along the shore of Lake Constance. The southern border depends on the course of Lake Constance after the melting of the Rhine glacier. It is usually at least a few kilometers long.

The area covers an area of 2,065 hectares, of which 1,960 hectares are on Austrian territory. About two thirds of the Rhine delta consists of water (1,300 hectares), which generally has a depth of just a few meters.

Nature park 
The Rhine delta is the largest wetland biotope reserve on Lake Constance and extends from the mouth of the Alter Rhein over the mouth of the Neuer Rhein to the Dornbirner Ach in Hard (Vorarlberg). Both Austria and Switzerland have each designated the area as a nature reserve.

Due to its great ecological importance, the Vorarlberg area of the Rhine delta is a wetland of international importance (a so-called Ramsar site). Since 1995, the nature reserve is part of the Natura 2000 network focussing on fauna-flora habitat and bird protection.

Fauna and flora

Fauna 
The variety of birds inhabiting the nature park contributes significantly to this ecological importance. To date, well over 300 bird species have been observed which makes the Rhine delta nature park popular among ornithologists and bird watchers. Shallow water and silt areas are important resting and breeding places as well as food spots for water birds and waders. Numerous rare and endangered species breed in the about 2,000 hectares of wet meadows, reed beds and riparian forests.
The Rhine delta is an ideal habitat for many amphibians, too. So far, nine species and a hybrid form (the edible frog) have been identified in this area. The large populations of water frogs are remarkable. European tree frogs and crested newts are also found locally in considerable numbers. Moreover, five native reptile species live in the area. In 2006, the wall lizard was first detected at the mouth of the Rhine. The wall lizard is a heat-loving lizard species with a distribution focus in the Mediterranean. They likely to have settled in Vorarlberg after having been exposed.

Although primarily known for its bird life, the Rhine delta is also an important habitat for mammals, especially for small mammals. The crowned shrew and the greater white-toothed shrew, among others, are found in the area and are restricted to the Alpine Rhine valley in Austria. So far, four bat species have been reliably detected. The beaver was eradicated in Vorarlberg in 1686 due to its fur and usage as a fasting meal. In 2006, beaver traces were discovered at the Old Rhine for the first time in over 300 years. In the meantime, the beaver has spread further and has already populated several bodies of water in the Rhine valley.

Flora 
 Although the land area comprises only about a third of the over 2000 hectare nature reserve, the Rhine delta offers habitat for numerous plant species. Riparian forests, scattered meadows, reed beds and grass beds are the most ecologically valuable rural habitats. Large flat water zones and special locations such as dams and ruderal areas increase biodiversity.
So far, around 600 flowering plants and ferns have been detected, with several species in all of Austria or in Central Europe under threat. 33 species of the area are considered lost or have become extinct. These include, for example, the waterwheel plant, a carnivorous aquatic plant, the rarity of which once led Ferdinand I of Bulgaria to the Rhine delta several times. The decline in species is primarily caused by drainage, intensified land use and river engineering. However, there is also a number of new species in the flora of the Rhine delta, especially from America and Asia, that mainly inhabits artificial locations such as the Rhine dams.

Tourism

Das Rheindeltahaus ("the Rhine delta house") 
The Rheindeltahaus is the service point and conservation station of the nature reserve. Visitors can gather information about guided excursions. It is a space for research, administrative work as well as public outreach work. Additionally, there are changing exhibitions about the Rhine delta.

The fir timber house was designed by the architecture firm HK Architekten, which are known for their wood-based public buildings across Vorarlberg. The Rheindeltahaus was completed in 1998. Taking into consideration the flood levels of its location in Fußach, the house is built on stilts. Due to a photovoltaic system and a heat recovery system, the house is a low-energy construction.

Cycling 
The Rhine delta cycle route is suitable for both sporty and leisurely cyclists. The route is about 47,4 km long and has only little ascent. Along the way on the Old Rhine and on the shores of Lake Constance, there is a variety of swimming spots.

Lagoon circular walk 

The lagoon tour in the Rhine delta along the dam offers a view onto Lake Constance, and in particular onto the Lindau island.

 Route: Rhine estuary – Fußach – In der Schanz – Lagoon – In der Schanz
 Distance: 4,7 km
 Duration: About 1,5 hours

Bird-watching 
With more than 340 recorded species (until 2002), the Rhine delta is a popular nature park among bird watchers. It is a well-known area for spotting rarities, especially waders. Since 1982, it is an Important Bird Area. 

The BirdsClub-App, an app created for the Rhine area, will help bird watchers identify the birds sighted.

See also 

 Alpine Rhine
 Lake Constance
 Nature parks in Switzerland

External links 

 Official website of the nature park
Website of the association "Naturschutzverein Rheindelta" (nature protection association Rhine delta)
List of birds in the Rhine delta nature park (PDF)

References 

Geography of Vorarlberg
Protected areas of Austria
Austria–Switzerland border
Ramsar sites in Austria
 
Nature parks
Parks in Austria
Nature reserves in Austria